The 2012–13 Coppa Italia, also known as TIM Cup for sponsorship reasons, was the 66th edition of the competition. As in the previous year, 78 clubs have taken part in the tournament. Napoli were the cup holders. Lazio were the winners, thus qualifying for the group stage of the 2013–14 UEFA Europa League.

Participating teams
Serie A (20 teams)

 Atalanta (round of 16)
 Bologna (quarter-finals)
 Cagliari (round of 16)
 Catania (quarter-finals)
 Chievo (fourth round)
 Fiorentina (quarter-finals)
 Genoa (third round)
 Internazionale (semi-finals)
 Juventus (semi-finals)
 Lazio (winner)
 Milan (quarter-finals)
 Napoli (round of 16)
 Palermo (fourth round)
 Parma (round of 16)
 Pescara (fourth round)
 Roma (Runner Up)
 Sampdoria (third round)
 Siena (round of 16)
 Torino (fourth round)
 Udinese (round of 16)

Serie B (22 teams)

 Ascoli (third round)
 Bari (second round)
 Brescia (second round)
 Cesena (fourth round)
 Cittadella (fourth round)
 Crotone (third round)
 Empoli (second round)
 Grosseto (second round)
 Juve Stabia (fourth round)
 Lecce (third round)
 Livorno (fourth round)
 Modena (third round)
 Novara (third round)
 Padova (third round)
 Pro Vercelli (second round)
 Reggina (round of 16)
 Sassuolo (third round)
 Spezia (third round)
 Ternana (third round)
 Varese (third round)
 Hellas Verona (round of 16)
 Virtus Lanciano (second round)

Lega Pro (27 teams)

 AlbinoLeffe (first round)
 Andria BAT (first round)
 Avellino (second round)
 Barletta (first round)
 Benevento (second round)
 Carpi (third round)
 Carrarese (second round)
 Catanzaro (first round)
 Chieti (second round)
 Cremonese (third round)
 Cuneo (first round)
 Frosinone (second round)
 Gubbio (first round)
 Lumezzane (second round)
 Nocerina (second round)
 Paganese (first round)
 Perugia (third round)
 Pisa (second round)
 Portogruaro (second round)
 Reggiana (first round)
 San Marino (first round)
 Sorrento (second round)
 Südtirol (second round)
 Trapani (second round)
 Treviso (first round)
 Vicenza (third round)
 Virtus Entella (second round)

LND – Serie D (9 teams)

 Arezzo (first round)
 Chieri (first round)
 Marino (first round)
 Cosenza (first round)
 Delta Porto Tolle (first round)
 Este (first round)
 Pontisola (second round)
 Sambenedettese (first round)
 Sarnese (first round)

Format and seeding
Teams enter the competition at various stages, as follows:
 First phase (one-legged fixtures)
 First round: 36 teams from Lega Pro and Serie D start the tournament
 Second round: the 18 winners from the previous round are joined by the 22 Serie B teams
 Third round: the 20 winners from the second round meet the 12 Serie A sides seeded 9–20
 Fourth round: the 16 survivors face each other
 Second phase
 Round of 16 (one-legged): the 8 fourth round winners are inserted into a bracket with the Serie A clubs seeded 1–8
 Quarter-finals (one-legged)
 Semi-finals (two-legged)
 Final (one-legged) at the Stadio Olimpico in Rome

Elimination rounds
The draw for 2012–13 Coppa Italia took place on 25 July.

Section 1

Match details

First round

Second round

Third round

Fourth round

Section 2

Match details

First round

Second round

Third round

Fourth round

Section 3

Match details

First round

Second round

Third round

Fourth round

Section 4

Match details

First round

Second round

Third round

Fourth round

Section 5

Match details

First round

Second round

Third round

Fourth round

Section 6

Match details

First round

Second round

Third round

Fourth round

Section 7

Match details

First round

Second round

Third round

Fourth round

Section 8

Match details

First round

Second round

Third round

Fourth round

Final stage

Bracket

Round of 16

Quarter-finals

Semi-finals

First leg

Second leg

Final

Top goalscorers

References
General

Specific

Coppa Italia seasons
Italy
Coppa Italia